Pearly Gates is a studio album by Jughead's Revenge, released in 1999. A lawsuit filed by Archie Comics forced the band to change their name to Jugg's Revenge; the band went on indefinite hiatus in 2001.

Critical reception
Exclaim! wrote that the album "proves exactly why this quartet is hailed one of the originators of the SoCal pop-punk sound that has been appropriated by so many other bands." Skiing deemed it "California hardcore as bright and perfect as the halfpipe dreams ricocheting between the ears of untold thousands of high schoolers."

Track listing
 "These Valley Streets" (2:45)
 "Lolita" (1:38)
 "Faust Part 2" (1:10)
 "No Time" (4:01)
 "Rising, Rising" (1:33)
 "Perfect" (2:02)
 "Swell" (2:15)
 "Make a Wish" (2:22)
 "Kill Security" (0:55)
 "You Never Know" (2:30)
 "Reprise" (1:35)
 "Rent a Cop Blues" (1:17)
 "Anthem" (2:20)
 "Just What I Needed (The Cars cover)" (3:36)

Personnel
 Joe Doherty − vocals
 Joey Rimicci − guitar
 Brian Preiss − bass
 Andy Alvarez − drums

References

1999 albums
Jughead's Revenge albums
Nitro Records albums